Raziabad (also Romanized as Raẕīābād) is a village in Shaban Rural District, in the Central District of Nahavand County, Hamadan Province, Iran. At the 2006 census, its population was 405, in 104 families.

References 

Populated places in Nahavand County